Andrew T. Fenrich (February 20, 1914 – December 1, 1992) was a Democratic member of the Pennsylvania House of Representatives.

Background
Born on February 20, 1914, in Allegheny County, Pennsylvania, Fenrich enlisted in the United States Navy during World War II, serving from 1943 to 1945, including aboard the USS Prince William from 1944 to 1945.

Elected president of the Paper Workers Union, American Federation of Labor, Fenrich worked as a salesman and later as a claims and lawsuit investigator, and also served as secretary to Pittsburgh mayor David Leo Lawrence, and as executive secretary and director of the Allegheny County Democratic Committee. Elected to the Pennsylvania House of Representatives in a special election on November 8, 1949, he was reelected in 1950 and 1952, but did not stand for reelection in 1954. Reelected to serve the 18th District in 1962, he served four additional consecutive terms, and was then reelected to serve the 20th District in 1972, but was not a candidate for reelection in 1974.

Death and interment
Fenrich died in Pittsburgh on December 1, 1992.

References

Democratic Party members of the Pennsylvania House of Representatives
1992 deaths
1914 births
20th-century American politicians
United States Navy personnel of World War II